McTigue may refer to:

 Brian McTigue (1930–1981), English rugby league footballer
 Maurice McTigue (born 1940), New Zealand politician
 Mike McTigue (1892–1966), Irish boxer
 Tom McTigue (born 1959), American actor and comedian

See also
 McTeague (disambiguation)
 McTeigue (disambiguation)

Surnames of British Isles origin